Soft tennis at the 2010 Asian Games was held in Guangzhou, China from 13 November 2010 to 19 November 2010. All events were held at Tianhe Tennis School.

Soft tennis had team, doubles and singles events for men and women, as well as a mixed doubles competition. South Korea, Chinese Taipei and Japan dominated the competition, China also won the remaining gold medal.

Schedule

Medalists

Medal table

Participating nations
A total of 85 athletes from 11 nations competed in soft tennis at the 2010 Asian Games:

References
Official website

 
2010
2010 Asian Games events
Asian Games
2010